Patrick O'Boyle may refer to:

 Patrick O'Boyle (cardinal) (1896–1987), Archbishop of Washington
 Patrick O'Boyle (Irish bishop) (1887–1971), Bishop of Killala

See also
Patrick Boyle (disambiguation)